In statistics, the variance inflation factor (VIF) is the ratio (quotient) of the variance of estimating some parameter in a model that includes multiple other terms (parameters) by the variance of a model constructed using only one term. It quantifies the severity of multicollinearity in an ordinary least squares regression analysis. It provides an index that measures how much the variance (the square of the estimate's standard deviation) of an estimated regression coefficient is increased because of collinearity. Cuthbert Daniel claims to have invented the concept behind the variance inflation factor, but did not come up with the name.

Definition
Consider the following linear model with k independent variables:
 Y = β0 + β1 X1 + β2 X 2 + ... + βk Xk + ε.

The standard error of the estimate of βj is the square root of the j + 1 diagonal element of s2(X′X)−1, where s is the root mean squared error (RMSE) (note that RMSE2 is a consistent estimator of the true variance of the error term); X is the regression design matrix — a matrix such that Xi, j+1 is the value of the jth independent variable for the ith case or observation, and such that Xi,1, the predictor vector associated with the intercept term, equals 1 for all i.  It turns out that the square of this standard error, the estimated variance of the estimate of βj, can be equivalently expressed as:

where Rj2 is the multiple R2 for the regression of Xj on the other covariates (a regression that does not involve the response variable Y).  This identity separates the influences of several distinct factors on the variance of the coefficient estimate:

 s2: greater scatter in the data around the regression surface leads to proportionately more variance in the coefficient estimates
 n: greater sample size results in proportionately less variance in the coefficient estimates
 : greater variability in a particular covariate leads to proportionately less variance in the corresponding coefficient estimate

The remaining term, 1 / (1 − Rj2) is the VIF.  It reflects all other factors that influence the uncertainty in the coefficient estimates.  The VIF equals 1 when the vector Xj is orthogonal to each column of the design matrix for the regression of Xj on the other covariates. By contrast, the VIF is greater than 1 when the vector Xj is not orthogonal to all columns of the design matrix for the regression of Xj on the other covariates.  Finally, note that the VIF is invariant to the scaling of the variables (that is, we could scale each variable Xj by a constant cj without changing the VIF).

Now let , and without losing generality, we reorder the columns of X to set the first column to be 

 .

Then we have, 

Here  is the coefficient of regression of dependent variable  over covariate .  is the corresponding residual sum of squares.

Calculation and analysis

We can calculate k different VIFs (one for each Xi) in three steps:

Step one 
First we run an ordinary least square regression that has Xi as a function of all the other explanatory variables in the first equation. If i = 1, for example,  equation would be

where  is a constant and e is the error term.

Step two 

 

Step three 
A rule of thumb is that if  then multicollinearity is high (a cutoff of 5 is also commonly used). However, there is no value of VIF greater than 0 in which the variance of the slopes of predictors isn't inflated. As a result, including two or more variables in a multiple regression that are not orthogonal (i.e. have correlation = 0), will alter each other's slope, SE of the slope, and P-value, because there is shared variance between the predictors that can't be uniquely attributed to any one of them.

Some software instead calculates the tolerance which is just the reciprocal of the VIF. The choice of which to use is a matter of personal preference.

Interpretation 
The square root of the variance inflation factor indicates how much larger the standard error increases compared to if that variable had 0 correlation to other predictor variables in the model.

Example
If the variance inflation factor of a predictor variable were 5.27 (√5.27 = 2.3), this means that the standard error for the coefficient of that predictor variable is 2.3 times larger than if that predictor variable had 0 correlation with the other predictor variables.

Implementation 

vif function in the car R package
ols_vif_tol function in the olsrr R package
PROC REG in SAS System
variance_inflation_factor function in statsmodels Python package
estat vif in Stata
r.vif addon for GRASS GIS

References

Further reading

See also
 Design effect

Regression diagnostics
Statistical ratios
Statistical deviation and dispersion

de:Multikollinearität#Varianzinflationsfaktor